James Bickford may refer to:
 James Bickford (bobsleigh)
 James Bickford (racing driver)